Tadla is a historical and geographical region of Morocco, located in the center of the country, north of the High Atlas mountain range and west of the Middle Atlas. It is the region of origin of the eponymous collection of tribal, semi-nomadic pastoralist population, the Tadla tribes.

Nowadays, the historical region of Tadla is mainly part of the administrative region of Béni Mellal-Khénifra, except for the historical territory of the Beni Meskine tribe, which is part of the Casablanca-Settat administrative region.
Regions of Morocco

History 

The Tadla region was one of the first regions of Morocco that was conquered by the Muslims during the 7th century. The region was relatively green and had a good agricultural potential, thus its name, Tadla, which comes from the Amazigh or Standard Moroccan Amazigh word "tadla" (written:ⵜⴰⴷⵍⴰ) meaning "the sheaf" (of wheat).

Geography

Demography 
The population of the Tadla is traditionally divided into 9 tribes, mainly of Arab origin:
 Aït Robʿa tribe: occupying the western part of the modern Beni Mellal Province, formed under Moulay Ismael (r. 1672–1727) by the merging of an original Tadla tribe (Beni Mellal) with three Guich tribes (Guettaya, Samguet and Beni Maʿdane)
 Beni ʿAmir tribe: occupying the northern part of the modern Fquih Ben Salah Province
 Beni Kheirane tribe: occupying the northwestern part of the modern Khouribga Province
 Beni Meskine tribe: occupying the southern part of the modern Settat Province, formerly part of the Tadla confederacy, joined the Chaouia confederacy in the 19th century
 Beni Moussa tribe: occupying the southern part of the modern Fquih Ben Salah Province
 Beni Zemmour tribe: occupying the eastern part of the modern Khouribga Province
 Ouardigha tribal confederacy: occupying the central and the western parts of the modern Khouribga Province; confederacy formed by 3 tribes: Oulad Bahr Kbar, Oulad Bahr Sghar and Smaʿla

References

Bibliography 
 Cpt. R. Peyronnet, "History of the Tadla from the origins to 1910", in: Bulletin de la Société de Géographie d'Alger et de l'Afrique du Nord, 24th y. (1919), pp. 49–62
 A. M. Qasimi, "History of the Bani ʿAmir tribe and the neighbouring Tadla, 1188-1956", D.N. (2005)

Geography of Morocco